The Jackrabbit Factor: Why You Can is a self-help book written by Leslie Householder and published in 2005 by Thoughtsalive, with a foreword by Trevan Householder. The term jackrabbit factor refers to a particular philosophical success principle, based on the analogy of a dog chasing a rabbit and was originally coined by the author.

The book
The Jackrabbit Factor: Why You Can was written as a story-form primer for Leslie's other book, Hidden Treasures: Heaven's Astonishing Help with Your Money Matters, and ranked #5 on BarnesAndNoble.com on the day the book was launched. (Hidden Treasures spent much of 2007 and 2008 on Amazon.com's top 100 in the Money & Values category.)

The Jackrabbit Factor is an extended version of the dog/rabbit analogy, which follows the fictional Goodman family as they struggle financially and have a number of encounters which help them learn the laws of thought related to success. It is also an e-book and an online course.

Principle
The term "jackrabbit factor" refers to the importance of being fixed on one's objective. According to the book, a person must be able to visualize the success they seek, and feel the success as though they have already achieved it before beginning the chase. Doing what someone else has done in order to duplicate their success is said to be as futile as is jumping and barking to produce a rabbit. The claim is that if the goal is in clear view, the actions needed to capture the prize will actually become instinctive.

If a person sees a dog chasing a rabbit, but could not see the rabbit, they would see the dog darting, barking and leaping around. To the bystander, the dog would seem crazy. This first part of the analogy compares the dog to a person with a dream for success. The person may seem to do erratic, crazy, irrational things in pursuit of the dream. If a bystander cannot "see" that person's dream, the person's behavior will appear crazed as well.

Taking the analogy further, if a man wanted a rabbit too, and decided to simply mimic the same steps as the dog without "seeing" a rabbit himself, he would actually repel all rabbits as he jumped and barked erratically (hoping that doing so would somehow produce a rabbit).  This compares directly to people who try to do precisely what another person has done in an effort to achieve the same success. It is claimed that this strategy will tend to repel the very success they seek.

Contents
The story begins with a married couple arguing about finances. Felicity berates Richard for his inability to provide for the family. Defeated, Richard disappears into the woods behind their home and Felicity fears he has gone to end his life. While she frantically searches for her husband, Richard falls into an exhausted sleep, embarking on a strange and enlightening allegorical journey where he discovers the secret behind the voice of inspiration. Felicity at breaking point, also learns certain things that she must do before she is able to find him.

The epilogue outlines a recommended pattern for goal setting, showing the importance of word selection. For example, it claims that to set a goal to "lose weight" will likely backfire, as a person's subconscious mind associates "lose" with something it must help them find; and "weight" with heaviness. Hence a goal to "lose weight" is said to be a direct command to one's subconscious mind to help them "find heaviness".  Also, to set a goal with the words, "I will (do, have, or be)..." keeps the attainment of the goal forever in future tense, merely by the selection of the word "will".

Alternatively, the principle of the jackrabbit factor teaches a person to compose the same goal statement in a different way, such as: "I am so happy and grateful now that I am slender and energetic. It feels great to be able to wear the clothes I love."

The author suggests that concentrating on how the attainment would feel reprograms a person's subconscious mind so that accomplishing the goal comes more naturally. These premises are based on the philosophy that without conscious intervention, the subconscious mind ultimately controls our tendencies, habits, decisions, and results.

Personal life

References

See also
James Allen (author)
As a Man Thinketh
Law of attraction
Abraham Maslow

Self-help books
2005 non-fiction books